Ovcha kupel is a Sofia Metro station on the M3 line. It was opened on 24 April 2021 as part of the second section of the line, from Ovcha kupel to Gorna Banya. The preceding station is Moesia and the adjacent station is Krasno Selo.

Location 
The station is located near the intersection of President Lincoln blvd. and Nikola Mushanov blvd.

Interchange with other public transport 
• Tramway service: 4, 11

• City Bus service: 60

References 

Sofia Metro stations
Railway stations opened in 2021
2021 establishments in Bulgaria